The 1977 Railway Cup Hurling Championship was the 51st staging of the Railway Cup since its establishment by the Gaelic Athletic Association in 1927. The cup began on 13 February 1977 and ended on 17 March 1977.

Munster were the defending champions.

On 17 March 1977, Leinster won the cup following a 2-17 to 1–13 defeat of Munster in the final. This was their 17th Railway Cup title overall and their first title since 1975.

Results

Semifinals

Final

Scoring statistics

Top scorers overall

Bibliography

 Donegan, Des, The Complete Handbook of Gaelic Games (DBA Publications Limited, 2005).

References

Railway Cup Hurling Championship
Railway Cup Hurling Championship
Hurling